Mount Pleasant Historic District is a national historic district located at Mount Pleasant, Cabarrus County, North Carolina. The district encompasses 98 contributing buildings and 3 contributing structures in the town of Mount Pleasant. It includes residential, institutional, and commercial buildings in a variety of popular architectural styles including Victorian, Colonial Revival, and Bungalow / American Craftsman. Notable buildings include the Jacob Ludwig House, Kindley Mill Village houses, Saint James Evangelical and Reformed Church, Lutheran Church of the Holy Trinity, Mount Pleasant Milling Company, Kindley Cotton Mill, and Tuscarora Cotton Mill.

It was listed on the National Register of Historic Places in 1986.

References

Historic districts on the National Register of Historic Places in North Carolina
Victorian architecture in North Carolina
Colonial Revival architecture in North Carolina
Buildings and structures in Cabarrus County, North Carolina
National Register of Historic Places in Cabarrus County, North Carolina